The Flat-coated Retriever is a gundog breed originating from England. It was developed as a retriever both on land and in the water.

Description

Appearance
The Flat-Coated Retriever has strong muscular jaws and a relatively long muzzle. Its head is unique to the breed and is described as being "of one piece" with a minimal stop and a backskull of about the same length as the muzzle. It has almond-shaped, dark brown eyes with an intelligent, friendly expression. The ears are pendant, relatively small, and lie close to the head. The occiput (the bone at the back of the skull) is not to be accentuated (as it is in setters, for example) with the head flowing smoothly into a well-arched neck. The topline is strong and straight with a well-feathered tail of moderate length held straight off the back. This breed should be well-angulated front and rear, allowing for open, effortless movement.
 The Flat-Coated Retriever comes in three colors – black, liver, and yellow.  However, yellow is a disqualifier in conformation, but they can compete in other venues.

Temperament
The Flat-Coated Retriever is an active, multitalented bird dog with a strong desire to please people. Exuberant, confident, and outgoing, they make a loving family pet and can be companions to small children, provided adults are nearby to direct this dog's boisterous enthusiasm. They are usually very good with other dogs and even cats. These retrievers require plenty of exercise and engagement to help channel their natural sporting energy. The British Kennel Club recommends that owners provide dogs with at least 2 hours of exercise a day. While they will protect their owners and property with an assertive bark, they are unlikely to back up such noise with actual aggression. Because of their excellent sense of smell, combined with their boundless energy and eagerness to please their masters, they are sometimes used as drug-sniffer dogs. They are used in the breeding program for The Guide Dogs for the Blind Association in the UK, both as a breed and as cross-breeds with the Labrador Retriever. 

Eager and quick to learn, they are best trained in short intervals, as they may bore with repetition. The Flat-Coated Retriever is a slow maturing dog, as they do not reach full maturity until 3–5 years of age. Even then, these dogs retain their youthful, puppy-like outlook and demeanor well into old age. Paddy Petch, author of The Complete Flat-Coated Retriever, refers to these dogs as the "Peter Pan" of the retriever breeds, given they never quite grow up.

The Flat-Coated Retriever is a "natural" breed and enjoys partaking in "natural" activities such as rolling in feces, playing in mud, and digging. These dogs are also "thinking" dogs, meaning they want to please but look for a way to bend the rules. This characteristic helps with their hunting ability but only if they are bonded with their owner. These dogs will work for themselves or not at all if there is no motivation to work with the handler or dog-handler bond present.

History

Originating in the mid-19th century in England, the Flat-Coated Retriever gained popularity as a gamekeeper’s dog. Part of its ancestry is thought to have come from stock imported from North America from the now extinct St. John's water dog, but this is unverified. Canadian seafarers are thought to have brought Newfoundlands to British ports, and they factored into the ancestry of the Flat-Coated Retriever. Collie-type dogs may have been added to increase the breed's trainability along with the Newfoundland for strength and Setter blood for enhanced scenting ability. The first examples of the breed were introduced around 1860, but the final type was only established 20 years later.

After its introduction into the U.S., the Flat-Coated Retriever began to quickly gain in popularity as a gun dog, and from 1873 when the breed became a "stable type" according to the American Kennel Club until 1915 when it was officially recognised as a breed, 
their number grew rapidly. However, soon after, their popularity began to decrease, eclipsed by the Golden Retriever, which was actually bred in part from the Flat-Coated Retriever, along with other breeds. By the end of World War II, so few Flat-Coated Retrievers remained, the breed's survival was uncertain. However, beginning in the 1960s, careful breeding brought the population back and the breed gained in popularity again, for both the sport of conformation showing, and as a companion pet. Today, the Flat-Coated Retriever enjoys a modest popularity and is moving ahead as a breed through attentive breeding for the conformation, health, multipurpose talent, and exceptional temperament that are its hallmarks. It has yet to return in substantial numbers to field competition.

In 2011, 'Sh Ch. Vbos The Kentuckian' (aka Jet), a 9.5-year-old Flat-Coated Retriever from South Queensferry, near Edinburgh, Scotland, won Best in Show at Crufts. Almanza Far and Flyg (a.k.a. Simon), from Oslo, Norway, won the Gundog Group at Crufts in 2007. Before that in 2003, a Swedish dog 'Inkwells Named Shadow' had also won the Gundog Group. The last UK dog to win the Gundog Group at Crufts was "Sh Ch Gayplume Dream-maker" in 2002. In 2022 Crufts, Baxer ‘Ch. Almanza Backseat Driver’, a 6 year old liver flat-coated retriever from Oslo Norway, won the Best in Show. The  previous other Flat-Coated Retriever to win Best in Show at Crufts was 'Ch. Shargleam Blackcap' in 1980. These wins have contributed to the breed's popularity in Europe and the United Kingdom.

Health
Regular tests and clearances for hereditary joint conditions such as hip dysplasia, deafness, and eye conditions such as progressive retinal atrophy and glaucoma should be conducted by breeders on any dogs used for breeding. Occasionally, epilepsy is also seen in the breed.

Flat-Coated Retrievers have a higher risk of cancer than most dogs. Hemangiosarcoma, fibrosarcoma, osteosarcoma, and malignant histiocytosis are particularly devastating, and occur at higher rates in them than in many other breeds. According to studies sponsored by the Flat-Coated Retriever Society of America (FCRSA), the average lifespan of the Flat-coated Retriever is only about eight years, with a high percentage of deaths due to cancer. More recent surveys in Denmark and the UK show a median lifespan around 10 years. A health survey of purebred dogs in the UK from 2010 showed approximately 50% of Flat-Coated Retrievers death were due to some form of cancer.

Another more common affliction amongst Flat-Coated Retrievers is gastric dilatation volvulus, otherwise known as bloat. This is not specific to Flat-Coats but it is common due to their large size and deep chests. If left untreated, the dog will die quickly. Gastric dilatation volvulus is responsible for 5% of all Flat-Coated Retriever deaths and around 20% of non-tumour related deaths.

Flat-Coated Retrievers have a very low rate of hip dysplasia and luxating patellas compared to other medium-sized breeds; the Orthopedic Foundation for Animals statistics consistently show a rate of hip dysplasia in the breed of less than 3%. In the 1997 FCRSA health survey, 4.2% of males and 3.2% of females had been diagnosed with luxating patellae.

See also
 Dogs portal
 List of dog breeds
 Curly-coated Retriever
 Golden Retriever
 Labrador Retriever

References

External links

 

Dog breeds originating in England
FCI breeds
Gundogs
Retrievers